"Unplayed By Human Hands" are the titles of two album recordings made in the mid-1970s of computerized organ performances recorded at the All Saints Church in Pasadena, California on their 90-rank Schlicker pipe organ. The project was headed by Prentiss Knowlton, a student of computer science at the University of Utah.

The computer employed for the task of controlling the pipe organ was a PDP-8 minicomputer manufactured by Digital Equipment Corporation (DEC) in 1965.

Track listing

unplayed by human hands - a computer performed organ recital - CR 9115

Side 1
RIMSKY-KORSAKOV: FLIGHT OF THE BUMBLE-BEE
ROGER DUCASSE: PASTORALE IN F
MOZART: OVERTURE FROM THE MARRIAGE OF FIGARO, K. 492
JOPLIN: MAPLE LEAF RAG

Side 2
BACH: CONCERTO IN A MINOR (after Vivaldi), BWV 593
IVES: VARIATIONS ON AMERICA

unplayed by human hands - in concert on the ninety-rank schlicker pipe organ - CH 9771

Side 1
Franz Schubert: INSTANT MUSIC
Dudley Buck: NEW ANGLES ON THE STAR-SPANGLED BANNER
Felix-Alexandre Guilmant: MARCHING-SONG OF THE ANGEL OF DEATH

Side 2
Dietrich Buxtehude: FANTASIA IN THE LAND OF THE FREE
Johan Halvorsen: ENTRY OF THE PRIVILEGED LANDHOLDING CLASS
Vladimir Ussachevsky: FANTASY: EVERYTHING IS COMPUTERIZED

Actual titles
The names of the songs as printed on this album are distorted in one way or another.
The following is a list of the actual titles and their composers.

6 Moments musicaux, Op.94 D.780 - No.3 in F minor (Allegro moderato) by Franz Schubert (1797 - 1828)
The Star spangled banner : concert variations for organ by Dudley Buck (1839 - 1909)
Marche funèbre et chant séraphique, opus 17 by Félix-Alexandre Guilmant (1837 - 1911)
Fantasia in F by Dietrich Buxtehude (1637 - 1707)
Entry of the Boyars by Johan Halvorsen (1864 - 1935)
Omnia computatus est by Vladimir Ussachevsky (1911 - 1990)

See also

http://stringcanphone.tribe.net/thread/7939abff-80bb-4489-a9d9-131365f48fb3

References

"unplayed by human hands" (LP album) CR 9115, Copyright 1975

http://www.cvfalcons.com/alumni/classof64al.html

1975 albums